Jacqueline Ruth Woods (May 5, 1929 – July 1, 2010) better known as Ilene Woods, was an American actress and singer. Woods was the original voice of the title character of the Walt Disney animated feature Cinderella, for which she was named a Disney Legend in 2003.

Early life
Her mother worked behind the scenes of films, taking Woods with her. As a little girl, Woods dreamed about becoming a schoolteacher, but her mother wanted her to become a singer. By 1944, she gained her own radio program. During World War II, she toured with Paul Whiteman and the Army Air Forces Orchestra.

Career
In 1948, two of her songwriter friends, Mack David and Jerry Livingston, called Woods to record "Bibbidi-Bobbidi-Boo", "A Dream Is a Wish Your Heart Makes", and "So This is Love". Soon, the songs were presented to Walt Disney so that they could be used in the English version of Cinderella. Walt Disney heard the demo recordings, and two days later asked Ilene to voice the star role of Cinderella. She gladly accepted the role, surprised that she had won against more than 300 others who had auditioned. She said in an interview for Classic Film, "Seeing it [the film] in its new form was breathtaking for me. It's so beautiful. The color is magnificent, it just took my breath away, it was so wonderful. I sort of forget when I'm watching the movie that I had anything to do with it. Yet, it brings back so many beautiful memories of working with the wonderful artists and working with Walt mostly. It brings back wonderful, wonderful memories." To promote Cinderella, Woods voiced Snow White in the 1949 Disney audiobook release of Snow White and the Seven Dwarfs. Woods sang for President Franklin D. Roosevelt at his home in Hyde Park. She also sang at the White House for President Truman, after singing for soldiers and sailors. Woods retired from show business in 1972, but she continued to appear at occasional autograph shows.

Personal life
She married the first time at the age of 17 to Stephen Steck, Jr. and had a daughter, Stephanie. After a divorce, she married The Tonight Show drummer Ed Shaughnessy in 1963. Woods and Shaughnessy had two sons, James and Daniel.

Later years
When Disney began releasing videocassette versions of its animated films, Woods was one of at least three actresses to file lawsuits over royalties for their performances; at the time of Woods' December 1990 filing, Peggy Lee of Lady and the Tramp (1955) had won her lawsuit the previous April and a 1989 suit by Mary Costa of Sleeping Beauty (1959) was still pending. Voice actress Jennifer Hale replaced Woods as the voice of Cinderella in the 2002 film Cinderella II: Dreams Come True. In 2003, Woods was awarded a Disney Legend award for her voicework on the film Cinderella. In an interview with Starlog in 2006 Woods said, "I love the idea that after I’m gone, children will still be hearing my voice [as Cinderella]."

Illness and death
Woods died from complications of Alzheimer's disease at a care facility in Canoga Park, Los Angeles on July 1, 2010, at the age of 81. No service was held; Woods was cremated.

Discography
 Walt Disney's Snow White and the Seven Dwarfs as Snow White (1949, RCA/Camden)
 It's Late (1957, Jubilee Records JGM 1046, LP, mono)

Filmography

Television

Television shows

Film

Radio

Awards and recognition

References

External links
 
 Disney Legends profile
 MovieWeb.com interview (2005) 

1929 births
20th-century American actresses
20th-century American women singers
20th-century American singers
Actresses from New Hampshire
American television actresses
American voice actresses
American women singers
California Democrats
Deaths from Alzheimer's disease
Jubilee Records artists
Deaths from dementia in California
New Hampshire Democrats
People from Portsmouth, New Hampshire
RCA Victor artists
2010 deaths
American radio actresses
Disney Legends